Higher Hall is a farmhouse located to the south of Edge Green in the civil parish of Edge, Cheshire, England.  It is recorded in the National Heritage List for England as a designated Grade II listed building.

The house dates from about 1845, and is built on the site of an earlier house.  It is constructed in red brick on a stone plinth, and has a slate roof with a tiled ridge.  The house consists of a rectangular block with a wing to the rear.  The windows in the front of the house are sashes, and elsewhere there is a mixture of sash windows and casements.  At the front of the house is a timber porch on a stone plinth with octagonal columns, behind which are pilasters.

See also

Listed buildings in Edge, Cheshire

References

Country houses in Cheshire
Grade II listed buildings in Cheshire